"Bucket" is a song by Canadian singer/songwriter Carly Rae Jepsen, released in April 2009 as the third single from her debut studio album, Tug of War. The song peaked at number 32 on the Canadian Hot 100. "Bucket" contains elements from "There's a Hole in My Bucket".

Music video
The official music video for the song premiered August 5, 2009, and received heavy airplay on Canadian music video channel MuchMusic. The video features Jepsen and her friends spending the day on the beach, ending with a bonfire scene. The video was shot in Vancouver, British Columbia, Canada in late April 2009, and the weather was "freezing cold" on the day of filming. All the extras in the video are Jepsen's real-life friends, and Jepsen commented that it felt more like a "beach party" than a music video.

Track listing

Chart performance

Certifications

Release history

References

External links
Official website

2009 singles
Carly Rae Jepsen songs
2008 songs
Songs written by Carly Rae Jepsen
Songs written by Ryan Stewart (songwriter)